Júlio Silva was the defending champion, but he lost to his compatriot, qualifier Rodrigo Guidolin in the quarterfinals.Rogério Dutra da Silva won the final against Facundo Argüello 6–4, 6–3.

Seeds

Draw

Finals

Top half

Bottom half

References
Main Draw
Qualifying Singles

BH Tennis Open International Cup - Singles
BH Tennis Open International Cup